The Ozark Highlands Trail roams  through parts of seven counties in northwest Arkansas. It stretches from Lake Fort Smith State Park, across the Ozark National Forest, to the Buffalo National River. The trail passes through some of the most remote and scenic portions of the Ozark Mountains, like the Hurricane Creek Wilderness Area. It also crosses White Rock Mountain, Hare Mountain, the Marinoni Scenic Area, and many other scenic spots.

The proposed route initially passed through 14 miles of wilderness area in the Buffalo National River park, and the National Park Service initially supported this route. However, they have since vetoed this proposed route.

References

External links
 Ozark Highlands Trail Hiking Information
 Ozarks Highland Trail Association

Highlands Trail
Hiking trails in Arkansas
Long-distance trails in the United States
Natural history of Arkansas
Ozark–St. Francis National Forest
National Recreation Trails in Arkansas